Salivary gland hyperplasia is hyperplasia of the terminal duct of salivary glands.

There are two types:

 Acinar adenomatoid hyperplasia 
 Ductal adenomatoid hyperplasia

References

Salivary gland pathology